Bohdan Ivanovych Semenets (born 27 November 1990) is a Ukrainian professional footballer who plays as a centre-forward for Ahrobiznes Volochysk in the Ukrainian First League.

Club career

Early years
Semenets is a product of the Ternopil regional youth system playing for the Ternopil city sports school and the youth club Inter-Hol Berezhany.

Ternopil
Semenets became the top scorer along with Vladyslav Korobkin and Andriy Draholyuk when he scored 15 goals for Ternopil during the 2012–13 Ukrainian Second League season.

International career
Semenets was a member of Ukraine national student football team at the 2013 and 2015 Summer Universiades.

References

External links
 
 

1990 births
Living people
Ukrainian footballers
Association football forwards
Ukraine student international footballers
FC Ternopil players
FC Nyva Ternopil players
FC Poltava players
FC Helios Kharkiv players
FC Ahrobiznes Volochysk players
Ukrainian First League players
Ukrainian Second League players
Sportspeople from Ternopil Oblast